Nicolae Donici (1/13 September 1874, Chişinău (currently the Republic of Moldova) - 1960, Puget-Theniers, Alpes-Maritimes, France) was a Romanian astronomer born in Bessarabia. Nicolae Donici (Donitch) was born into an old family of Romanian nobles from Bessarabia in the Petricani region of Chişinău. He graduated from the University in Odessa (Ukraine). Subsequently, he served as state clerk in Saint Petersburg (Russia). Concomittantly he had his own private observatory.  He conducted research in countries such as Spain, Russia, Portugal, Indonesia, Egypt, Turkey, Algeria and United States. He was an honorary member of the Romanian Academy and doctor honoris causa of the University of Heidelberg and of the Coimbra Institute in Portugal. His main scientific interest were the Sun and its eclipses, planetary astronomy, zodiacal light.The main astronomical instrument în Dubăsarii Vechi in the InterWars period was a big spectroheliograph, which allowed to make first class photographs of the Sun and study the spectra of the Sun. Some american Historians supposed, that Donitch, being close to some governmental circles in Saint Petersburg before 1917, particularly to the family of Obolensky, which was close to the Czar family, was implied in Public Diplomacy in order to convince Nationalist circles in Egypt to liberate from Colonial occupation by Ottoman Empire. The Astronomical observatory in Dubăsarii Vechi (Bessarabia), directed by Nicolae Donici enjoyed a number of astronomers from everywhere: the German: Emanuel von der Pahlen, the Russian emigrants: Lev Ocoulitch and Andrei Baikov. During the inter Wars period the observatory in Dubăsarii Vechi served also  as a meteorological station which sent regularly reports to Central Institute of Meteorology in Bucharest. The main meteorologist was Nina Gouma.
Donitch was a member of the International Union for Solar research, of the International Astronomical Union (since its first Congress in 1922), of the Romanian Academy (since 1922). In 1948 he was excluded from the Academy by communist authorities of Romania. He refugeed to France (Nice) where he continued to work in the collaboration with Henri Chrétien and other French astronomers.  In 1991 he was reestablished to the Romanian Academy. The place and exact date of dye of Nicolas Donitch was established by Magda Stavinschi in collaboration with French astronomer Francoise Le Guet Tully  He was married to Maria Perks.  The asteroid 9494 Donici is named after him. The most important publications were signed as Donitch

References

External links 
 A group of Russian astronomers in 1920 during the Civil War. The second from the right -  Nicolas Donici
 ADS NASA
The Library of Congress
A.A. Baikov (1886–1958), A.Gaina. The astronomer - N.N. Donitch

Romanian astronomers
1874 births
1960 deaths